In Vietnamese cuisine, bánh bột chiên are fried rice flour cakes. It is a Chinese-influenced rice flour based dish, which exists in many versions all over Asia; the Vietnamese version features a special tangy soy sauce on the side, rice flour cubes with fried eggs (either duck or chicken), and some vegetables. This is a popular after-school snack for young students in southern regions of Vietnam.

See also
 Turnip cake
 Chai tow kway
 Bánh
 List of cakes

References

Vietnamese pastries